Ekoball Stal Sanok is a Polish football club based in Sanok.

They reached the 1/4 of final in the Polish Cup in the 2008/2009 season, and notable cup exploits include giant-killing Legia Warsaw. The club spent majority of time at third and fourth levels of Polish football pyramid, only once winning the promotion to the 2 division. Stal Sanok is one of the most well-known and supported clubs in the region. Their main rivals are Karpaty Krosno. The best goalscorer in history of Stal Sanok and one of the most legendary players was Jerzy Pietrzkiewicz. 

There used to be an ice-hockey section, but the section became an independent club STS Sanok.

The club rebranded in 2016 due to financial problems to Ekoball Stal Sanok.  Current head coach is Piotr Kot while his assistant coach Damian Niemczyk is also one of the most important players of the first team. Robert Ząbkiewicz who used to be the head coach of the team before is now the team manager, and Adrian Terkała is the head of marketing.

External links
  Official club website
  Unofficial club website
  Official fans website
  Stal Sanok at the 90minut.pl website (Polish)

Football clubs in Poland
Association football clubs established in 1946
1946 establishments in Poland
Association football clubs disestablished in 2016
Sanok
Sport in Podkarpackie Voivodeship